Bergen (Oberbayern) station is a railway station in the municipality of Bergen, located in the Traunstein district in Bavaria, Germany.

References

Railway stations in Bavaria
Buildings and structures in Traunstein (district)
Railway stations in Germany opened in 1860
1860 establishments in Bavaria